Petersburg is an unincorporated community in Kent County, Delaware, United States. Petersburg is located on Delaware Route 10, southwest of Camden and west of Woodside.

References

Unincorporated communities in Kent County, Delaware
Unincorporated communities in Delaware